Fort Road Bridge is a girder bridge that spans the Mississippi River between Saint Paul, and Fort Snelling, Minnesota, United States. It was built in 1960 by the Minnesota Department of Transportation  and was designed by Sverdrup & Parcel Engineering Company.  It is the third bridge on the site. The first bridge, a deck girder bridge, was built in 1880. The second bridge, a metal arch bridge, was built by 1912.

Image gallery: the Fort Road Bridge

See also
List of crossings of the Upper Mississippi River

References
 MNDOT Consumer Access: Road and Bridge Plans, Bridge 9300.  Accessed 2006-04-16.
 Highland - Ramsey County Historical Society.  Accessed 2006-04-17.

1880 establishments in Minnesota
Bridges completed in 1880
Bridges completed in 1912
Bridges completed in 1961
Bridges in Saint Paul, Minnesota
Bridges over the Mississippi River
Girder bridges in the United States
Mississippi Gorge
Road bridges in Minnesota